Nothobranchius hoermanni is a species of brightly colored seasonal killifish in the family Nothobranchiidae. This species is endemic to seasonal freshwater habitats in central Tanzania. It is currently known from ephemeral pools and marshes associated with the Mhwala system in the upper Wembere drainage, as well as the Wala system, a tributary of the Malagarasi drainage. The type locality is associated with the headwaters of the Mhwala system.

Sources

Links
 Nothobranchius hoermanni on WildNothos 

hoermanni
Fish described in 2020
Fish of Tanzania
Endemic fauna of Tanzania